Costera may refer to:

La Costera, a comarca in Valencia, Spain
Costera (plant), a genus of plants in the Ericaceae